Michael Clement Irving Gibbs (born 25 September 1937) is a Rhodesian-born English jazz composer, conductor, arranger and producer as well as a trombonist and keyboardist.

He is known for collaborations with vibraphonist Gary Burton, his student, and for his use of rock elements in orchestral jazz.

Career
Gibbs was born in Harare, Southern Rhodesia (now Zimbabwe). He moved to Boston, Massachusetts, United States in 1959, in order to study at the Berklee College of Music and Boston Conservatory. In 1961, Gibbs took scholarships at the Lennox School of Jazz and later at Tanglewood Music Center. Initially returning to Rhodesia, Gibbs later settled in England.

After recording with Graham Collier, John Dankworth, Kenny Wheeler and Mike Westbrook in the late 1960s, Gibbs released his first album, Michael Gibbs, in 1970. From 1970 to 1974, Gibbs was musical director for the BBC TV comedy programme The Goodies. When he left the UK to take up a teaching position at Berklee, the musical director post was filled by Dave MacRae, a member of the band Gibbs had led in recording funk rock music for the show. After resigning from that teaching position in 1983, Gibbs became a freelance arranger and producer, working variously with Jaco Pastorius, Michael Mantler, Joni Mitchell, Pat Metheny, John McLaughlin, Whitney Houston, Vladislav Sendecki, Peter Gabriel and Sister Sledge. In 1991, he toured and recorded with John Scofield.

During the years 1999–2000, he worked at the Sibelius Academy Jazz Department in Helsinki where he had a professorship (part-time) in Jazz Composition and Arranging.

On 2 October 2017, Gibbs was presented with a BASCA Gold Badge Award, in recognition of his unique contribution to music. In 2017, Gibbs was awarded an honorary doctorate of music from his alma mater, Berklee College of Music.

Discography

As leader
 Michael Gibbs (Deram, 1970)
 Tanglewood 63 (Deram, 1971)
 Just Ahead (Polydor, 1972)
 In the Public Interest with Gary Burton (Polydor, 1974)
 Seven Songs for Quartet and Chamber Orchestra (1974, ECM)
 Directs the Only Chrome Waterfall Orchestra (Bronze, 1975)
 Will Power with Neil Ardley, Ian Carr, Stan Tracey (Argo, 1975)
 Big Music with Bob Moses, Chris Hunter, Lew Soloff, Dave Bargeron, etc. (Venture, 1988, re-issued with additional track, ACT, 1996)
 Europeana: Jazzphony No. 1 with Joachim Kuhn (ACT, 1995)
 Nonsequence (Provocateur, 2001)
 Here's a Song for You with the NDR Big Band, Norma Winstone (Fuzzy Moon, 2011)
 Back in the Days with the NDR Big Band (Cuneiform, 2012)
 Mike Gibbs + 12 play Gil Evans (Whirlwind, 2013)
 In My View with the NDR Big Band (Cuneiform, 2015)
 Play a Bill Frisell Set List with the NDR Big Band (Cuneiform, 2015)
 Festival 69 with Gary Burton (Turtle, 2018)
 MIKE GIBBS BAND Symphony Hall Birmingham 1991 - feat. John Scofield Trio, (DuskFire Co.Uk, 2018)

Scores
 Secrets (1971)
 Madame Sin (1972)
 Intimate Reflections (1975)
 Housekeeping (Varèse Sarabande, 1987)
 Close My Eyes (1991)
 Iron & Silk (The Fine Line, 1991)
 Century (1993)
 Hard Boiled (The Fine Line, 1993)
 Being Human  (Varèse Sarabande, 1994)
 Century/Close My Eyes (The Fine Line, 1994)

As sideman
 Graham Collier, Deep Dark Blue Centre (Deram, 1967)
 Kenny Wheeler, Windmill Tilter (Fontana, 1969)
 Barry Guy/The London Jazz Composers' Orchestra, Ode (Incus, 1972)
 Nguyen Le, NDR Big Band, Celebrating the Dark Side of the Moon (ACT, 2014)
 Eberhard Weber, Pat Metheny, et al., Hommage à Eberhard Weber'' (ECM, 2015)

References

External links
Discography
Goodies Podcast - audio interview with Mike Gibbs recorded 6 March 2010.
 Interview for Cheltenham Jazz Festival, 9 April 2013.
 British Academy of Songwriters, Composers and Authors
 Review of Big Music on allmusic.com

1937 births
ACT Music artists
Living people
Rhodesian people of British descent
White Rhodesian people
Zimbabwean emigrants to the United Kingdom
Rhodesian composers
Jazz composers
Mute Records artists
Polydor Records artists
Virgin Records artists
People from Harare
Blast First artists
Bronze Records artists
New Jazz Orchestra members
Varèse Sarabande Records artists
Cuneiform Records artists
Argo Records artists
Deram Records artists